Natxo Lezkano Moya (born 17 October 1972) is a Spanish professional basketball coach, who currently manages Liberbank Oviedo Baloncesto of the Spanish LEB Oro. Since 2011, he has coached Ivory Coast's national basketball team, which he led to two Final Four finishes at the FIBA Africa Championship. He also led professional teams in Venezuela and Spain.

In 2020, Lezkano re-joined the Ivory Coast national basketball team, and led the team to a silver medal at FIBA AfroBasket 2021.

References

External links
Palencia Baloncesto Profile
Eurobasket.com Profile

1972 births
Living people
Basketball coaches
Spanish basketball coaches
People from Portugalete
Liga ACB head coaches
Saski Baskonia coaches
Sportspeople from Biscay